"Hooligan's Holiday" is a song by American heavy metal band, Mötley Crüe, released on their 1994 eponymous album. The lyrics to the song were written by vocalist/rhythm guitarist John Corabi and bassist Nikki Sixx, while the music was written by Corabi, Sixx, drummer Tommy Lee and guitarist Mick Mars. It was the first song recorded by John Corabi for the 1994 Mötley Crüe (album)

Release
Released as a single in 1994, it was the first single that featured the band with Corabi. A video for the song was produced and received some airplay on MTV. The single was released in a variety of packages, including a CD single, 7-inch single, and a 12-inch single (which came with a sticker featuring the new band logo).

Track listing
All songs written by Nikki Sixx, John Corabi, Mick Mars and Tommy Lee.

"Hooligan's Holiday" (Brown Nose Edit)
"Hooligan's Holiday" (LP version)
"Hypnotized"

Remixes
A remix version by Skinny Puppy was produced in 1994 and was released on the rarities album Supersonic and Demonic Relics.

Other appearances
"Hooligan's Holiday" also on the following Mötley Crüe compilation albums:
Supersonic and Demonic Relics
Red, White & Crüe

Charts

References

1994 singles
1994 songs
Mötley Crüe songs
Songs written by Nikki Sixx
Songs written by Tommy Lee
Songs written by Mick Mars
Songs written by John Corabi
Song recordings produced by Bob Rock
Alternative metal songs